The Chiesa di San Nicolò da Tolentino, commonly known as the Tolentini, is a church in the sestiere of Santa Croce in Venice, northern Italy. It lies in a Campo of the same name and along the Rio dei Tolentini, near the Giardino Papadopoli.

History
The Theatines arrived in Venice in 1527 after the Sack of Rome. The church dedicated to Saint Nicholas of Tolentino was begun in 1590 by Vincenzo Scamozzi. The relationship between Scamozzi and his patrons was stormy, and the church was finally completed only in 1714. It is a large church with a huge freestanding Corinthian portico, the only one in Venice, designed by Andrea Tirali.

The Tolentini is a parish church of the Vicariate of San Polo-Santa Croce-Dorsoduro. The church contains the tomb of Doge Giovanni I Corner, Francesco Corner, Giovanni II Corner, and Paolo Renier. The funereal monument of the Patriarch of Venice,  Giovan Francesco Morosini (d.1678) in the chancel, was completed by the Genovese sculptor Filippo Parodi. The baroque organ was constructed by Pietro Nacchini in 1754.

Works of art

 Johann Liss ( Inspiration of St Jerome to the left of chancel (image may be copy).
 Bernardo Strozzi (St Lawrence Giving Alms in the chancel)
High altar by Baldassare Longhena

Santa Croce (Venice)
Roman Catholic churches in Venice
Roman Catholic churches completed in 1714
Renaissance architecture in Venice
Neoclassical architecture in Venice
1714 establishments in Italy
Theatine churches
18th-century Roman Catholic church buildings in Italy
Neoclassical church buildings in Italy